Sir Edward Whitaker (1660 – 20 November 1735) was an officer of the Royal Navy. He served during the War of the Spanish Succession and is known for his role in the Capture of Gibraltar and the Battle of Málaga in 1704.

Life
Edward Whitaker was born in 1660. For three years he and his crew captured many French privateers and supporting prize money. On 27 September 1692 he married Ann Stephens of Leigh on Essex.

On 13 January 1702 fifty ships were commissioned on one day and Whitaker briefly was given  before he became master-attendant at Woolwich. At the start of 1702 he very briefly commanded  before he took up the command that was to make his name. Whitaker commanded  as part of the fleet under George Rooke in 1704.

Capture of Gibraltar 

During the 1704 Capture of Gibraltar Whitaker was Sir George Byng's aide-de-camp. 'his ship not being upon service,’ Whitaker commanded a successful attack on Gibraltar and it was Whitaker who regained command when the successful attackers were confused into a retreat when a Spanish magazine exploded. Two of his captains had led this attack whilst Whitaker was trying to get authority for the attack from Byng. William Jumper was mentioned particularly by Whitaker and a he was later honoured by having Jumper's Bastion named after him.

Later actions
In the Battle of Málaga on 24 August 1704 Whitaker was still in command of the Dorsetshire and was at the centre of the action. In 1705 Whitaker commanded  and in the first few months of 1706 he became Sir Edward Whitaker, rear-admiral of the blue, commanding a squadron of ships in the English Channel escorting the Duke of Marlborough to Holland in April.

Whitaker became a vice-admiral of the blue after he took over Leake's command. On 14 November 1709 he was made vice-admiral of the white. In January 1708 Sir George Byng took over as commander in chief in the Mediterranean with Whitaker as second in command, until Byng went back to England in 1709. Whitaker returned in 1710 and married again, as his first wife had died in 1705. He went on to take a significant role in the occupation of Dunkirk in 1712. He retired, and in 1713 moved from Number 25 Soho Square to Number 36. Whitaker died on 20 November 1735 at Carshalton in Surrey, where he was buried.

Legacy
The Royal Navy named two ships . The first was a destroyer ordered towards the end of the First World War but later cancelled; the second was a frigate in service during the Second World War.

References

1660 births
1735 deaths
Royal Navy admirals
British naval commanders in the War of the Spanish Succession